Fankerton is a small village which lies within the Falkirk council area of Scotland.

The village is located on the south side of the River Carron along the B818 road on the outskirts of the town of Denny. 

Fankerton is the home of Strathcarron Hospice which provides free palliative care to people throughout Central Scotland.

The population of Fankerton at the time of the 2001 census was 214 residents.

References

External links

Canmore - Carrongrove Paper Mills site record

Villages in Falkirk (council area)
Denny, Falkirk